Jennifer Burns may refer to:

 Jennifer Burns, Arizona politician
 Jennifer Burns, author of Goddess of the Market
 Jennifer Burns (actress) on List of Power Rangers Lost Galaxy characters

See also
 Jennifer Burnes, musician
 Jennifer Byrne, Australian journalist, television presenter and book publisher
 Jennifer Byrne (research scientist)